Finlayson may refer to:

People:
 Finlayson (surname)

Places:
 Finlayson (district), Tampere, Finland
 Finlayson, Minnesota, United States
 Finlayson Township, Pine County, Minnesota, United States
 Finlayson Lake Airport in Yukon, Canada

In fiction:
 Baby Face Finlayson, a fictional character in the UK comic strip The Beano

Other:
 Finlayson (company), a Finnish textile company

See also
Finlay (disambiguation)
 Finlayson & Co, cotton mill founded by James Finlayson (industrialist) in Tampere, Finland